In mathematics, the classical Kronecker limit formula describes the constant term at s = 1 of a real analytic Eisenstein series (or Epstein zeta function) in terms of the Dedekind eta function. There are many generalizations of it to more complicated Eisenstein series. It is named for Leopold Kronecker.

First Kronecker limit formula
The (first) Kronecker limit formula states that

where

E(τ,s) is the real analytic Eisenstein series, given by

for Re(s) > 1, and by analytic continuation for other values of the complex number s.
γ is Euler–Mascheroni constant
τ = x + iy with y > 0.
 , with q = e2π i τ is the Dedekind eta function.

So the Eisenstein series has a pole at s = 1 of residue π, and the (first) Kronecker limit formula gives the constant term of the Laurent series at this pole.

This formula has been used in string theory for the one-loop computation in Polyakov's perturbative approach.

Second Kronecker limit formula
The second Kronecker limit formula states that

where
u and v are real and not both integers.
q = e2π i τ and qa = e2π i aτ
p = e2π i z and pa = e2π i az

for Re(s) > 1, and is defined by analytic continuation for other values of the complex number s.

See also 

 Herglotz–Zagier function

References
Serge Lang, Elliptic functions, 
C. L. Siegel, Lectures on advanced analytic number theory, Tata institute 1961.

External links
 Chapter0.pdf

Theorems in analytic number theory
Modular forms